Dolores (IPA: [ˌdoˈlorɛs]), officially the Municipality of Dolores, is a 3rd class municipality in the province of Eastern Samar, Philippines. According to the 2020 census, it has a population of 44,626 people.

Dolores is a coastal town bounded on the east by the Pacific Ocean in the Eastern Visayas region of the Philippines.  It has many beaches and small islands.  Most of the populace speak and understand English.

History
In 1948, the barrios of Can-avid, Carolina, Barok, Cansangaya, Mabuhay, Camantang, Canilay, Pandol and Balagon, formerly part of this town, were separated into the municipality of Can-avid, Eastern Samar, by virtue of Republic Act No. 264.

Geography

Barangays 
Dolores is politically subdivided into 46 barangays.

Climate

Demographics

Language
The languages spoken are Waray-Waray, and Cebuano, locals are also literate in both English and Filipino.

Religion
Most of the people are predominantly Roman Catholic, and some belonging to other Christian denominations as well as minority religious sects.

Economy 

Major sources of livelihood in Dolores include farming and fishing, according to the Department of the Interior and Local Government (DILG) Region VIII.

Transportation 
Pedicabs and tricycles are the means of transportation within the town, while multi-cabs, jeepneys, and vans are the means of transportation to neighboring and distant towns within the province. Several bus companies are also operating from the town going to Manila or Tacloban City and vice versa.

Dolores has an airfield where the abandoned Picardo Airport is located. The airport has an unusable short runway.

Education 
Dolores has 32 public elementary schools, 4 public high schools with 1 Tech-Voc (Technical and Vocational) high school, and 1 private college.

Elementary schools 

 Dolores Central Elementary School
 Aroganga Elementary School
 Magongbong Elementary School
 Buenavista Elementary School
 Cabago-an Elementary School
 Caglao-an Elementary School
 Cagtabon Elementary School
 Dampigan Elementary School
 Dapdap Central Elementary School
 Del Pilar Elementary School
 Denigpian Elementary School
 Gap-ang Elementary School
 Japitan Elementary School
 Jicontol Elementary School
 Hilabaan Elementary School
 Hinolaso Elementary School
 Libertad Elementary School
 Magasaysay Elementary School
 Malabago Elementary School
 Osmeña Elementary School
 Rizal Elementary School
 San Isidro (Malabag) Elementary School
 San Pascual Elementary School
 San Roque Elementary School
 San Vicente Elementary School
 Santa Cruz Elementary School
 Santo Niño Elementary School
 Tanauan Elementary School
 Villahermosa Elementary School
 Bonghon Elementary School
 Malaintos Elementary School
 Tikling Elementary School

Secondary schools 

 Dolores National High School
 Hilabaan National High School
 Hinolaso National High School
 Caglao-an National High School
 Dapdap National Technical and Vocational High School

Colleges/Universities 

 Mater Divinae Gratiae College

References

External links
 [ Philippine Standard Geographic Code]
 Philippine Census Information
 Local Governance Performance Management System 
 Department of the Interior and Local Government 

Municipalities of Eastern Samar